The 2018 Nippon Professional Baseball (NPB) Draft was held on October 25, for the 54th time at the Grand Prince Hotel Takanawa to assign amateur baseball players to the NPB. It was arranged with the special cooperation of Taisho Pharmaceutical Co. with official naming rights. The draft was officially called "The Professional Baseball Draft Meeting supported by Lipovitan D". 2018 marked the 6th consecutive year in which Taisho Pharmaceuticals had sponsored the event.

Summary 

Only the first round picks were allowed to be contested with all picks from the second round onward being based on table placing in the 2018 NPB season in a waiver system. Waiver priority was based on inter-league results. As the Pacific League teams came out on top against Central League opposition, Pacific League teams were given preference.  From the third round the order was reversed continuing in the same fashion until all picks were exhausted.

First round Contested Picks 

 Bolded teams indicate who won the right to negotiate contract following a lottery.
 In the first round, Wataru Matsumoto (Pitcher) was selected by the Lions without a bid lottery.
 In the second round, Ryo Ohta (Infielder) was selected by the Buffaloes without a bid lottery.
 In the thrird round, Koji Chikamoto (Outfielder) was selected by the Tigers, Yuki Takahashi (Pitcher) by the Giants ,Hiroshi Kaino (Pitcher)  by the Hawks, and Noboru Shimizu (Pitcher) by the Swallows without a bid lottery.
 List of selected players.

Selected Players 

The order of the teams is the order of second round waiver priority.
 Bolded After that, a developmental player who contracted as a registered player under control.
 List of selected players.

Tohoku Rakuten Golden Eagles

Hanshin Tigers

Chiba Lotte Marines

Chunichi Dragons

Orix Buffaloes

Yokohama DeNA Baystars

Hokkaido Nippon-Ham Fighters

Yomiuri Giants

Fukuoka SoftBank Hawks

Tokyo Yakult Swallows

Saitama Seibu Lions

Hiroshima Toyo Carp

References

External links 
 プロ野球ドラフト会議 supported by リポビタンD - NPB.jp Nippon Professional Baseball

Nippon Professional Baseball draft
Draft
Nippon Professional Baseball draft
Nippon Professional Baseball draft
Baseball in Japan
Sport in Tokyo
Events in Tokyo